Puppy cat (or puppy-like cat, canine-like cat, dog-like cat, etc.) is a term used to refer to specific breeds of domestic cats that have unusual behavioral tendencies that are reminiscent of young domestic dogs. These are within the scope of feline behavior, and may be enhanced through selective breeding. These behaviors, not specific to any breed, include following people around from room to room, the desire to receive frequent moments of physical affection such as being held and petted, a lack of aggression toward some fellow animals, and a placid nature. While these attributes are found desirable for owners interacting with their cats, problems can occur when the felines are exposed to dogs and people who wish to harm them, with the cats possibly being too trusting and too friendly for their own good. Breeds known for these canine behaviors include the Abyssinian, Burmese, Maine Coon, Manx, and Ragdoll, though dog behavior traits can appear regardless of breed.

Breeds
The cultural assumption that cats are distant from people and lack affection compared to dogs is not entirely correct. Animals have individual characteristics based on their environment, particularly their past interactions with people. The nature of selective breeding for both canines and felines varies dramatically across different human cultures as well, with highly distinctive traits (fertility, lifespan, speed, etc.) receiving emphasis depending on the historical context.

The feline temperament is particularly malleable to a wide set of environmental factors, especially sudden stresses. For example, after dangerous floods in Canvey Island, cats showed behaviors of psychological shock akin to human struggles. Well-raised kittens frequently demonstrate affection towards humans and a pleasant, docile nature regardless of pedigree. These broad traits are not specific to any particular breed, as the upbringing of the animal is an important factor. Positive interaction with humans in the first few months of life is particularly vital.

Most feline pets in the United States are considered to be domestic short-haired cats, a catch-all term for those with mixed or otherwise unclear ancestries but having related appearances. Several of those cats, or those of the standardized American Shorthair breed, will respond differently to others despite looking very similar, displaying dog-like or otherwise unexpected tendencies. Besides breed-based generalizations, a particular cat's behavior can be assessed by its restraint in using claws during play, its tendency to follow people, and its appreciation of close, frequent human contact.

Abyssinian

Abyssinian cats are known for demanding attention and showing depression if left alone too often. The closeness to their owners causes some of them to respond positively to feline leash-training. Unlike most cats, Abyssinians often show interest in water rather than a fear of it. A frequently active breed, Abyssinians will often climb upon their owners and perch upon their bodies to see. They also tend to welcome the company of friendly-minded dogs.

Veterinarian Joan O. Joshua has said the "dog-like attachment to the owners" of Abyssinians causes "greater dependence on human contacts". This stands in contrast to the mere "tolerant acceptance of human company" based on "comforts" that multiple other breeds display. With their interest in playing with their owners combined with their curious intelligence, Abyssinians are nicknamed the "Clowns of the Cat Kingdom."

Burmese
The Burmese breed typically displays the dog-like attachment seen in Abyssinians. They both also share the combination of high intelligence and tendency to stay close that makes training them to be on a leash practical. The Burmese are persistently more vocal than other breeds, this leading VCA Animal Hospitals to state that the typical one "enjoys engaging in conversation". Their energetic nature also encourages play to an extent far more commonly associated with dogs.

American and British breeders have developed distinctly different standards for the Burmese, a situation that's unusual among pedigreed cats, and the British type has attracted the colloquial title of 'European Burmese'. Many modern cat registries, however, don't recognize the difference between subtypes given the high degree of similarity between the cats' behaviors. However, their physical appearance can vary widely between those groups.

Maine Coon

Maine Coons are, according to Academy of Veterinary Nutrition Technicians President Kara Burns and Dr. Lori Renda-Francis, "often referred to as 'dog like'." This description is not only due to their large size and stature but also because of the cats' usually pleasant mannerisms plus their tendency to closely follow their owners and obey them. Maine Coon cats additionally are often trainable given their intelligence and affectionate nature. The felines have large and silky coats yet grooming is made easier given their desire to be frequently handled. According to the Cat Fanciers' Association, Maine Coons offer "hours of enjoyment with their antics", though they are "intrusive" since "[w]ithout question" the cats "want to be [a] part of everything".

Manx
The Manx breed displays behaviors akin to puppies, such as coming when their owners whistle or call their names. They are known for jumping and climbing about obstacles as well as burying things, even collecting and burying toys at times. Manx felines will also display strong affection generally. Dr. David Taylor, writer and founder of the International Zoo Veterinary Group, has said they are "positively dog-like".

Ragdoll

Ragdolls are named for an earlier tendency of the breed to go limp when picked up, and their tendencies to rest in a doll-like, bent position. They usually display a calm, relaxed temperament, with the animals often seeking physical affection from owners and following owners around. They sometime play games such as fetch.

Other puppy cat breeds
Other cat breeds which are also known for puppy-like behavior are:

Turkish Angora
Birman
Bombay
Chartreux
American Curl
Sphynx
Oriental Shorthair
Lykoi

See also

Cat behavior
Cat communication
Cat intelligence
Human interaction with cats

References

Cat behavior
Cats as pets
Cats in popular culture